The Central District of Bojnord County is a district (bakhsh) in Bojnord County, North Khorasan Province, Iran. At the 2006 census, its population was 238,632, in 60,238 families.  The District has two cities: Bojnord & Chenaran.  The District has three rural districts (dehestan): Aladagh Rural District, Baba Aman Rural District, and Badranlu Rural District.

References 

Districts of North Khorasan Province
Bojnord County